María Esther García López (born, 8 December 1948, La Degollada, Valdés, Asturias) is a poet and writer in Asturian and Spanish. She is the president of the Asociación de Escritores de Asturias (Asturias Writers Association).

She graduated in pedagogy. She is a teacher and expert in Asturian philology. García is a corresponding member of Academia de la Llingua Asturiana. She served as professor at Universidá Asturiana de Branu (UABRA) for 25 years. She also participated as a jury member in numerous literary competitions and poetry recitals.

Awards and honours
2005, Tribute in Luarca from the “Valdés Siglo XXI” Women's Association for her work as a writer and researcher and for her work around the recovery of Asturian language and culture and the defense of women's rights.
2007, Uviéu Poetry Prize, in its first edition, with the poetry book Pisadas.
2007, Winner of the Fernández Lema short story award with the story "Performance".
2007, “Xosé Álvarez” Award for a short story organized by the Asturian Center of Madrid.
2007, “Bronze Grouse”, an award given by the Asturianu Center in Madrid.
2009, Prize "León Delestal" Asturian Center of Madrid with the story The wedding.
2015, Third Prize for poetry "Andén" on the occasion of International Women's Day.
2015, "Friend of the Joaquín Rodríguez de Ḷḷuarca Library" Award.
2015, “Vaqueira de Honor” from the Vaqueiro and Vaqueirada Festival.
2015, "Timón" Award for her literary career.
2017, The Valdés Town Hall dedicates the Ḷḷibru de Ḷḷuarca Day to him.
2017, Poetisa del Alba for Alborada de Candás.

Selected works 

El Tatuaxe, 1998
Ḷḷuribaga, 2003
Zamparrampa: Poemas pa nenos ya nenas, 2004
Tiempu d'iviernu, 2005
Aventures del Quixote, 2005
Historias de Vida ya señas de muerte, 2006
Faraguyas, 2007
Pisadas, 2008
La maestra, 2008
Musical-landia, 2008
Performance, 2009
Menú de Versos, 2009
Deva y El Pitín, 2010
A la gueta l'amor, 2010
Alredor de la Quintana: Animales y otros bichos, 2013
Quiero ser Arcu Iris, 2014
Yo taba ellí, 2015
Yo estaba allí, 2016
Deva, Flor de Primvera, 2017
Leo, 2018
Haikusnora, 2019
El color de los días, 2019
La bruja en la Biblioteca, 2019
A veces el amor es azul, 2020

References 

1948 births
Living people
21st-century Spanish writers
20th-century Spanish writers
21st-century Spanish women writers
20th-century Spanish women writers
Writers from Asturias
Asturian-language writers